Stop Snitchin–Stop Lyin is the sixth mixtape album/DVD by rapper the Game. It features artists like Lil' Kim, Ice Cube, E-40, Chingy, WC, Paul Wall and others.

Certification
In 2006 the mixtape was certified platinum in Ireland, which sold 15,000 units and the DVD was also certified gold.

Track listing

References

External links
AREA51 Media Group

The Game (rapper) albums
2005 mixtape albums